The Concentration of Light Prior to Combustion the debut split album of PGR/Thessalonians, released in 1986 by Banned Production.

Track listing

Personnel
Adapted from the liner notes of The Concentration of Light Prior to Combustion.

Thessalonians
 Kim Cascone – instruments, mixing (B1-B3)
 David Gardner – instruments, mixing (B1-B3)
 David James – instruments, mixing (B1-B3)
 Kurt Robinson – instruments, mixing (B1-B3)
 Larry Thrasher – instruments, mixing (B1-B3)

PGR
 Kim Cascone – instruments
 Dine Forbate – instruments
 Larry Thrasher – instruments

Production and design
 Anthony Michael King (as AMK) – design
 Leonard Marcel – engineering (B1-B3)
 Kevin McMahon – assistant engineering (B1-B3)

Release history

References

External links 
 The Concentration of Light Prior to Combustion at Discogs (list of releases)

1986 debut albums
1986 live albums
Split albums
PGR (American band) albums
Thessalonians (band) albums